Camp de Noé was in 14 hectare internment camp straddling the municipalities of Noé, Le Fauga and Mauzac, south of Toulouse (Haute-Garonne). It should not be confused with the Mauzac detention camp in the Dordogne.

History 
This camp was created in 1941 by the French Ministry of War to hold Spanish Republicans and  Jews under Vichy France's anti-Semitic laws.  The camp occupied about 14 hectares to the north of Noé where about 2,500 foreigners, about half Jews and half Spanish were held here from February 1941 until July 1942.

The camp was liberated by the Maquis on 19 August 1944 and was then used for the internment of collaborators, but with the same guards. It finally closed in 1947.

People who passed through the camp 

 Alexander Grothendieck
 Henri Caillavet
 Jules Saliège
 Francesco Fausto Nitti

Bibliography
 Éric Malo, Les Camps d'internement du Midi de la France, Municipal Library of Toulouse, 1990
 Denis Peschanski, Les Camps d'internement en France, Paris, PUF, 2002

See also 
 Camp du Récébédou
 Épuration légale
 Fondation pour la Mémoire de la Shoah
 Internment camps in France

References

External links 
 De Vichy à la Quatrième République : le camp de Noé (1943-1945)
 Camp de Noé
 Camp de Noé
 Fiche de d'arrivée de Fernand Belino

World War II concentration camps
History of Haute-Garonne
Concentration camps in France